Ralph was  an Archdeacon of Barnstaple during the early part of the Thirteenth century.

References

Archdeacons of Barnstaple